Gyraulus euphraticus is a species of gastropods belonging to the family Planorbidae.

The species is found in India.

References

euphraticus
Gastropods described in 1874